The 2003–04 Cypriot Third Division was the 33rd season of the Cypriot third-level football league. APOP Kinyras won their 1st title.

Format
Fourteen teams participated in the 2003–04 Cypriot Third Division. All teams played against each other twice, once at their home and once away. The team with the most points at the end of the season crowned champions. The first three teams were promoted to the 2004–05 Cypriot Second Division and the last three teams were relegated to the 2004–05 Cypriot Fourth Division.

Point system
Teams received three points for a win, one point for a draw and zero points for a loss.

Changes from previous season
Teams promoted to 2003–04 Cypriot Second Division
 PAEEK FC
 Akritas Chlorakas
 Omonia Aradippou

Teams relegated from 2002–03 Cypriot Second Division
 Chalkanoras Idaliou
 AEK/Achilleas Ayiou Theraponta
 Anagennisi Germasogeias

Teams promoted from 2002–03 Cypriot Fourth Division
 Orfeas Nicosia
 Ethnikos Latsion FC
 AEK Kythreas

Teams relegated to 2003–04 Cypriot Fourth Division
 Othellos Athienou
 Achyronas Liopetriou
 Elia Lythrodonta

Also, before the start of the season, Kinyras Empas and APOP Peyia were merged to form APOP Kinyras, which took the place of Kinyras Empas in the Cypriot Third Division.

League standings

Results

See also
 Cypriot Third Division
 2003–04 Cypriot First Division
 2003–04 Cypriot Cup

Sources

Cypriot Third Division seasons
Cyprus
2003–04 in Cypriot football